Thyrocopa apikia is a moth of the family Xyloryctidae. It was described by Matthew J. Medeiros in 2009 and is endemic to the Hawaiian island of Molokai.

The length of the forewings is 14–16 mm. The forewing ground color is brown to dark brown to rich purplish brown. Sometimes there are very faint darker spots visible in the cell. The hindwings are light brown, as is the fringe. Adults are on wing from at least May to September.

Etymology
Apikia is a form of a Hawaiian word meaning "deceptive". The specific epithet refers to the initial confusion of this moth with Thyrocopa subahenea. The two have similar wing patterns and range, but their genitalia are very different.

External links

Thyrocopa
Endemic moths of Hawaii
Biota of Molokai
Moths described in 2009